Air Marshal Sir Robert Victor Goddard,  (6 February 1897 – 21 January 1987) was a senior commander in the Royal Air Force during the Second World War.

Goddard is perhaps best known for his interest in paranormal phenomena; he claimed to have witnessed a clairvoyant incident in 1946 on which the feature film The Night My Number Came Up (1955) was later based.

Early life
Goddard was born at Wembley the son of Dr Charles Goddard. After attending St George's School, Harpenden, he went to the Royal Naval Colleges at Osborne and Dartmouth. He served as a midshipman in the first year of the First World War and in 1915 joined the Royal Naval Air Service. At this time he met his lifelong friend Barnes Wallis. For a period he was patrolling for submarines in dirigibles, but in 1916 commanded reconnaissance flights over the Somme battlefield.

Between the wars
In 1921, Goddard was selected to read engineering at Jesus College, Cambridge and then studied at Imperial College London before returning to Cambridge in 1925 as an instructor to the university's air squadron. After graduating from the Royal Naval Staff College in 1929, he commanded a bomber squadron in Iraq. He returned to England in 1931 as chief instructor of the officers' engineering course. He was then at the Staff College until 1935 when he was appointed deputy director of intelligence at the Air Ministry. He held this post until the outbreak of the Second World War.

Goddard later claimed to have had a clairvoyant episode in 1935, at RAF Drem, in Scotland. While the airfield was abandoned at the time, Goddard reportedly saw it as it would appear in 1939, after it had been reactivated.

Second World War

Goddard went with the British Expeditionary Force to France in 1939. He was made senior air staff officer in the following year and played a major part in preserving British air assets in the face of the German attacks. When he returned he became director of military cooperation at the Air Ministry, responsible for modernising air support and airborne forces in the RAF. He also made regular air war broadcasts on the BBC.

In September 1941, shortly before the attack on Pearl Harbor, he was appointed as Air Commodore Chief of the Air Staff, Royal New Zealand Air Force (RNZAF). As commander of the RNZAF in the South Pacific, and the only British commander in the region, he was prominent in the operations against the Japanese initial advance. Under Admiral Halsey, US Navy, he commanded the RNZAF in the Battle of Guadalcanal and the Solomon Islands campaigns, for which he was awarded the American Navy Distinguished Service Medal. In the 1943 King's Birthday Honours, he was appointed a Companion of the Order of the Bath.

Goddard was posted to India in 1943, to take charge of administration for the air command of South East Asia Command (SEAC). He remained in the role until 1946 when he became the RAF's representative in Washington.

He claimed to have witnessed the clairvoyant experience of another officer, in China during January 1946. According to Goddard,  he was at a party in Shanghai and scheduled to fly to Tokyo that same night, when he heard of another officer having a dream in which Goddard was killed in a plane crash. In the dream an aircraft was carrying Goddard, two other men and a woman, when it experienced difficulties with atmospheric icing, and crashed on a pebbled beach near mountains. That night Goddard was persuaded to take two men and a woman on the Douglas Dakota transport flying to Tokyo. As in the other's officer's dream, the Dakota plane iced over and was forced to make a crash-landing on the Japanese island of Sado; the crash scene, a pebbled beach near mountains, resembled that described in the dream. Unlike the dream, however, no-one was injured.

The story was published in The Saturday Evening Post of May 26, 1951, and the 1955 film, The Night My Number Came Up, was based on the incident. Michael Redgrave played Goddard, who was depicted in the film as becoming excited as the plane made its crash-landing. That reportedly annoyed Goddard, who had been proud of what he had seen as his unemotional behaviour.

Later life
Goddard retired in 1951, and became principal of the College of Aeronautics, where he remained until 1954. He was also a governor of St George's School Harpenden and of Bryanston School and was president of the Airship Association from 1975 to 1984.

He encouraged Sir George Trevelyan to set up the Wrekin Trust, a body promoting "spiritual education" in 1971. It occupied much of his time in retirement. Through it he became convinced of the reality of the world of the spirit. He spent many years investigating, and lecturing on, flying saucers. On 3 May 1969, he gave a talk on UFOs at Caxton Hall in London, in which he defended the paraphysical hypothesis.

Goddard argued for extrasensory perception and other paranormal phenomena in his book Flight Towards Reality (1975). His claims are disputed by sceptics.

Goddard wrote the foreword to Muriel Dowding's 1980 autobiography and Allan Barham's Strange to Relate (1984).

Family
Goddard married Mildred Catherine Jane Inglis, the daughter of Alfred Inglis and his wife Ernestine (Nina) Pigou (daughter of Francis Pigou, the Dean of Bristol), in 1924. Their daughter, Jane Helen Goddard, was married to Sir Robin Chichester-Clark.

Publications
The Enigma of Menace (1959)
Flight Towards Reality (1975)
Skies to Dunkirk, (1982)

References

External links
 Air of Authority – A History of RAF Organisation – Air Mshl Sir Victor Goddard
 Imperial War Museum Interview from 1973
 Imperial War Museum Interview from 1978

 

1897 births
1987 deaths
People from Wembley
Graduates of the Royal Naval College, Greenwich
Alumni of Jesus College, Cambridge
Alumni of Imperial College London
People educated at the Royal Naval College, Osborne
Royal Naval Air Service aviators
New Zealand military personnel of World War II
Royal New Zealand Air Force air marshals
Royal Air Force air marshals of World War II
Commanders of the Order of the British Empire
Foreign recipients of the Distinguished Service Medal (United States)
Knights Commander of the Order of the Bath
Parapsychologists
English writers on paranormal topics
Recipients of the Navy Distinguished Service Medal
Military personnel from London
Royal Naval Air Service personnel of World War I